Pierre Prieur (25 May 1896 – 22 December 1968) was a French field hockey player. He competed in the men's tournament at the 1928 Summer Olympics.

References

External links
 

1896 births
1968 deaths
French male field hockey players
Olympic field hockey players of France
Field hockey players at the 1928 Summer Olympics
Place of birth missing